Juno Beach is a town in Palm Beach County, Florida, United States. Its population was 3,176 at the 2010 census. As of 2018, the population recorded by the U.S. Census Bureau was estimated at 3,648. Juno Beach is home to the headquarters of Florida Power & Light. It was also the original county seat for the area that was then known as Dade County. Juno Beach is in the Miami metropolitan area.

History

As a sister settlement to the town of Jupiter to the north, the development was named, at some point in the 19th century, after Jupiter's wife, the ancient Roman goddess Juno. The designation in 1944 of a namesake D-Day landing beach in Normandy, named for Juno Dawnay, a Canadian officer's wife, was purely coincidental.

A pier was built in 1946 and the town was platted in 1948. The original pier was destroyed during a November storm in 1984  and a new 993-foot Juno Beach Pier built in 1999.

Geography

Juno Beach is located at  (26.873404, –80.054063).

Climate

Demographics

2020 census

As of the 2020 United States census,  3,858 people, 2,190 households, and 1,049 families were residing in the town.

2000 census
At the 2000 census, 3,262 people, 1,791 households, and 929 families resided in the town. The racial makeup of the town was 97.82% White (of which 95% were non-Hispanic white), 0.43% African American, 0.12% Native American, 0.61% Asian, 0.06% Pacific Islander, 0.34% from other races, and 0.61% from two or more races. Hispanics or Latinos of any race were 3.37%.

Of the 1,791 households, 9.1% had children under 18 living with them, 47.8% were married couples living together, 3.0% had a female householder with no husband present, and 48.1% were not families. About 42.9% of households were one person and 25.5% were one person 65 or older.  The average household size was 1.80, and the average family size was 2.42.

The age distribution was 10.1% under 18, 2.3% from 18 to 24, 16.2% from 25 to 44, 28.8% from 45 to 64, and 42.6% 65 or older.  The median age was 60 years. For every 100 females, there were 84.9 males.  For every 100 females 18 and over, there were 79.7 males.

The median household income was $55,263 and the median family income was $68,382. Males had a median income of $50,545 versus $36,842 for females. The per capita income for the town was $50,344.  About 3.9% of families and 4.5% of the population were below the poverty line, including 5.7% of those under 18 and 2.7% of those 65 or over.

As of 2000, speakers of English as a first language accounted for 96.34% of all residents, while French made up 2.01%, Greek was at 1.00%, and Spanish accounted for 0.63% of the population.

The political climate in Juno Beach is leaning liberal. The property crime rate is around the US national average, with the violent crime rate well below average.

Places of interest

 Juno Dunes Natural Area
 Loggerhead Park and Loggerhead Marinelife Center

References

External links

Town of Juno Beach Official Website

Juno Beach Police Foundation Police Foundation Website

  Florida Place Names Origin of the name

Towns in Palm Beach County, Florida
Towns in Florida
Populated coastal places in Florida on the Atlantic Ocean
Former county seats in Florida
Beaches of Palm Beach County, Florida
Beaches of Florida